Acrididae is a family of short-horned grasshoppers in the order Orthoptera. There are 29 subfamilies, more than 1,400 genera, and over 6,700 described species in Acrididae, according to Orthoptera Species File.

Acrididae genera

 Subfamily Acridinae MacLeay, 1821
 Tribe Acridini MacLeay, 1821
 Acrida Linnaeus, 1758
 Caledia Bolívar, 1914
 Calephorops Sjöstedt, 1920
 Cryptobothrus Rehn, 1907
 Froggattina Tillyard, 1926
 Keshava Gupta & Chandra, 2017
 Perala Sjöstedt, 1921
 Rapsilla Sjöstedt, 1921
 Schizobothrus Sjöstedt, 1921
 Tribe Calephorini Johnston, 1956
 Calephorus Fieber, 1853
 Tribe Gymnobothrini Uvarov, 1953
 Brachybothrus Popov, 2019
 Chirista Karsch, 1893
 Comacris Bolívar, 1890
 Coryphosima Karsch, 1893
 Guichardippus Dirsh, 1959
 Gymnobothrus Bolívar, 1889
 Hulstaertia Ramme, 1931
 Keya Uvarov, 1941
 Malcolmburria Uvarov, 1953
 Oxybothrus Uvarov, 1953
 Rastafaria Ramme, 1931
 Roduniella Bolívar, 1914
 Tenuihippus Willemse, 1994
 Zacompsa Karsch, 1893
 Tribe Hyalopterygini Brunner von Wattenwyl, 1893
 Allotruxalis Rehn, 1944
 Cocytotettix Rehn, 1906
 Eutryxalis Bruner, 1900
 Guaranacris Rehn, 1944
 Hyalopteryx Charpentier, 1845
 Metaleptea Brunner von Wattenwyl, 1893
 Neorphula Donato, 2004
 Orphula Stål, 1873
 Parorphula Bruner, 1900
 Paulacris Rehn, 1944
 Tribe Pargaini Uvarov, 1953
 Acteana Karsch, 1896
 Machaeridia Stål, 1873
 Odontomelus Bolívar, 1890
 Parga Walker, 1870
 Phryganomelus Jago, 1983
 Tribe Phlaeobini Brunner von Wattenwyl, 1893
 Genus Group Afrophlaeoba
 Afrophlaeoba Jago, 1983
 Brachyphlaeobella Jago, 1983
 Chlorophlaeobella Jago, 1983
 Chokwea Uvarov, 1953
 Chromochokwea Jago, 1983
 Paralobopoma Rehn, 1914
 Parodontomelus Ramme, 1929
 Platyverticula Jago, 1983
 Genus Group Duronia
 Duronia Stål, 1876
 Duroniella Bolívar, 1908
 Leopardia Baccetti, 1985
 Oxyduronia Popov, 2019
 Genus Group Ocnocerus
 Anacteana Popov, 2019
 Hyperocnocerus Uvarov, 1953
 Ocnocerus Bolívar, 1889
 Panzia Miller, 1929
 Rhabdoplea Karsch, 1893
 Sumba Bolívar, 1909
 Cannula Bolívar, 1906
 Chlorophlaeoba Ramme, 1941
 Culmulus Uvarov, 1953
 Glyphoclonus Karsch, 1896
 Holopercna Karsch, 1891
 Mesophlaeoba Kumar & Usmani, 2015
 Oxyphlaeobella Ramme, 1941
 Phlaeoba Stål, 1861
 Phlaeobacris Willemse, 1932
 Phlaeobella Ramme, 1941
 Phlaeobida Bolívar, 1902
 Pseudophlaeoba Bolívar, 1914
 Pyrgophlaeoba Miller, 1929
 Sikkimiana Uvarov, 1940
 Sinophlaeoba Niu & Zheng, 2005
 Sinophlaeobida Yin & Yin, 2007
 Xerophlaeoba Uvarov, 1936
 Tribe Truxalini Serville, 1838
 Acridarachnea Bolívar, 1908
 Chromotruxalis Dirsh, 1950
 Oxytruxalis Dirsh, 1950
 Truxalis Fabricius, 1775
 Truxaloides Dirsh, 1950
 Xenotruxalis Dirsh, 1950
 Aeropedelloides Liu, 1981
 Anaeolopus Uvarov, 1922
 Bababuddinia Bolívar, 1917
 Bambesiana Koçak & Kemal, 2008
 Brachyacrida Dirsh, 1952
 Calliphlaeoba Ramme, 1941
 Capulica Bolívar, 1917
 Carinacris Liu, 1984
 Carliola Uvarov, 1939
 Chromacrida Dirsh, 1952
 Closteridea Scudder, 1893
 Cohembia Uvarov, 1953
 Conuacris Willemse, 1932
 Covasacris Liebermann, 1970
 Dorsthippus Donskoff, 1977
 Duroniopsis Bolívar, 1914
 Eoscyllina Rehn, 1909
 Epacromiacris Willemse, 1933
 Euprepoptera Uvarov, 1953
 Euthynous Stål, 1877
 Julea Bolívar, 1914
 Kaloa Bolívar, 1909
 Lemuracris Dirsh, 1966
 Lobopoma Karsch, 1896
 Luzonica Willemse, 1933
 Megaphlaeoba Willemse, 1951
 Neophlaeoba Usmani & Shafee, 1983
 Nimbacris Popov & Fishpool, 1992
 Nivisacris Liu, 1984
 Orthochtha Karsch, 1891
 Oxyolena Karsch, 1893
 Oxyphlaeoba Ramme, 1941
 Palawanacris Ramme, 1941
 Pamacris Ramme, 1929
 Paracoryphosima Descamps & Wintrebert, 1966
 Paraduronia Bolívar, 1909
 Paraphlaeoba Bolívar, 1902
 Paraphlaeobida Willemse, 1951
 Pasiphimus Bolívar, 1914
 Perella Bolívar, 1914
 Phlocerus Fischer von Waldheim, 1833
 Phorinia Bolívar, 1914
 Plagiacris Sjöstedt, 1931
 Pseudoeoscyllina Liang & Jia, 1992
 Pseudopargaella Descamps & Wintrebert, 1966
 Pseudoptygonotus Zheng, 1977
 Ruganotus Yin, 1979
 Rugophlaeoba Willemse, 1951
 Shabacris Popov & Fishpool, 1992
 Sherifuria Uvarov, 1926
 Urugalla Uvarov, 1927
 Vietteacris Descamps & Wintrebert, 1966
 Vitalisia Bolívar, 1914
 Weenenia Miller, 1932
 Wellawaya Uvarov, 1927
 Xenocymochtha Popov & Fishpool, 1992
 Xenoderus Uvarov, 1925
 Yendia Ramme, 1929
 Zambiacris Johnsen, 1983
 Zygophlaeoba Bolívar, 1902
 Subfamily Calliptaminae Jacobson, 1905
 Acorypha Krauss, 1877
 Bosumia Ramme, 1929
 Brachyxenia Kirby, 1914
 Calliptamus Serville, 1831
 Damaracris Brown, 1972
 Indomerus Dirsh, 1951
 Palaciosa Bolívar, 1930
 Paracaloptenus Bolívar, 1878
 Peripolus Martínez y Fernández-Castillo, 1898
 Sphodromerus Stål, 1873
 Sphodronotus Uvarov, 1943
 Stobbea Ramme, 1929
 Subfamily Caryandinae Yin & Liu, 1987
 Caryanda Stål, 1878
 Cercina Stål, 1878
 Lemba Huang, 1983
 Subfamily Catantopinae Brunner von Wattenwyl, 1893
 Tribe Allagini Johnston, 1956
 Allaga Karsch, 1896
 Sauracris Burr, 1900
 Tribe Apoboleini Johnston, 1956
 Apoboleus Karsch, 1891
 Pseudophialosphera Dirsh, 1952
 Squamobibracte Ingrisch, 1989
 Tribe Catantopini Brunner von Wattenwyl, 1893
 Subtribe Apotropina Key, 1993
 Apotropis Bolívar, 1906
 Azelota Brunner von Wattenwyl, 1893
 Burcatelia Sjöstedt, 1930
 Clepsydria Sjöstedt, 1920
 Epallia Sjöstedt, 1921
 Fipurga Sjöstedt, 1921
 Goniaeoidea Sjöstedt, 1920
 Percassa Sjöstedt, 1921
 Perunga Sjöstedt, 1921
 Schayera Key, 1990
 Subtribe Aretzina Key, 1993
 Aretza Sjöstedt, 1921
 Brachyexarna Sjöstedt, 1921
 Exarna Brunner von Wattenwyl, 1893
 Macrocara Uvarov, 1930
 Terpillaria Sjöstedt, 1920
 Zebratula Sjöstedt, 1920
 Subtribe Buforaniina Key, 1993
 Buforania Sjöstedt, 1920
 Cuparessa Sjöstedt, 1921
 Phanerocerus Saussure, 1888
 Raniliella Sjöstedt, 1921
 Tapesta Sjöstedt, 1921
 Subtribe Catantopina Brunner von Wattenwyl, 1893
 Catantops Schaum, 1853
 Catantopsilus Ramme, 1929
 Catantopsis Bolívar, 1912
 Diabolocatantops Jago, 1984
 Nisiocatantops Dirsh, 1953
 Stenocatantops Dirsh, 1953
 Subtribe Cirphulina Key, 1993
 Chirotepica Sjöstedt, 1936
 Cirphula Stål, 1873
 Macrolopholia Sjöstedt, 1920
 Subtribe Coryphistina Mistshenko, 1952
 Adreppus Sjöstedt, 1921
 Beplessia Sjöstedt, 1921
 Camelophistes Key, 1994
 Charpentierella Key, 1994
 Coryphistes Charpentier, 1845
 Euophistes Sjöstedt, 1920
 Macrolobalia Sjöstedt, 1921
 Relatta Sjöstedt, 1921
 Spectrophistes Key, 1994
 Subtribe Cratilopina Key, 1993
 Caperrala Sjöstedt, 1921
 Cratilopus Bolívar, 1906
 Exarhalltia Sjöstedt, 1930
 Typaya Sjöstedt, 1921
 Subtribe Ecphantina Key, 1993
 Alectorolophellus Ramme, 1941
 Alectorolophus Brunner von Wattenwyl, 1898
 Althaemenes Stål, 1878
 Ecphantus Stål, 1878
 Happarana Sjöstedt, 1920
 Lyrolophus Ramme, 1941
 Mengkokacris Ramme, 1941
 Paralectorolophus Ramme, 1941
 Sulawesiana Koçak & Kemal, 2008
 Subtribe Eumecistina Key, 1993
 Asoramea Sjöstedt, 1921
 Cervidia Stål, 1878
 Erythropomala Sjöstedt, 1920
 Eumecistes Brancsik, 1895
 Euomopalon Sjöstedt, 1920
 Genurellia Sjöstedt, 1931
 Microphistes Sjöstedt, 1920
 Pardillana Sjöstedt, 1920
 Pespulia Sjöstedt, 1921
 Retuspia Sjöstedt, 1921
 Subtribe Goniaeina Key, 1993
 Goniaea Stål, 1873
 Subtribe Hepalicina Key, 1993
 Hepalicus Sjöstedt, 1921
 Subtribe Loiteriina Key, 1993
 Loiteria Sjöstedt, 1921
 Subtribe Maclystriina Key, 1993
 Maclystria Sjöstedt, 1921
 Perloccia Sjöstedt, 1936
 Subtribe Macrazelotina Key, 1993
 Macrazelota Sjöstedt, 1921
 Rusurplia Sjöstedt, 1930
 Subtribe Macrotonina Key, 1993
 Macrotona Brunner von Wattenwyl, 1893
 Theomolpus Bolívar, 1918
 Xypechtia Sjöstedt, 1921
 Subtribe Micreolina Key, 1993
 Micreola Sjöstedt, 1920
 Sjoestedtacris Baehr, 1992
 Sumbilvia Sjöstedt, 1921
 Subtribe Peakesiina Key, 1993
 Caloptilla Sjöstedt, 1921
 Catespa Sjöstedt, 1921
 Cedarinia Sjöstedt, 1920
 Cuprascula Sjöstedt, 1921
 Curpilladia Sjöstedt, 1934
 Desertaria Sjöstedt, 1920
 Lagoonia Sjöstedt, 1931
 Peakesia Sjöstedt, 1920
 Perelytrana Sjöstedt, 1936
 Testudinellia Sjöstedt, 1930
 Xanterriaria Sjöstedt, 1934
 Yrrhapta Sjöstedt, 1921
 Zabrala Sjöstedt, 1921
 Subtribe Perbelliina Key, 1993
 Ablectia Sjöstedt, 1921
 Capraxa Sjöstedt, 1920
 Minyacris Key, 1992
 Perbellia Sjöstedt, 1920
 Phaulacridium Brunner von Wattenwyl, 1893
 Porraxia Sjöstedt, 1921
 Rectitropis Sjöstedt, 1936
 Subtribe Russalpiina Key, 1993
 Russalpia Sjöstedt, 1921
 Sigaus Hutton, 1898
 Tasmanalpina Key, 1991
 Tasmaniacris Sjöstedt, 1932
 Truganinia Key, 1991
 Subtribe Stropina Brunner von Wattenwyl, 1893
 Adlappa Sjöstedt, 1920
 Collitera Sjöstedt, 1921
 Parazelum Sjöstedt, 1921
 Stropis Stål, 1873
 Subtribe Urnisina Key, 1993
 Rhitzala Sjöstedt, 1921
 Urnisa Stål, 1861
 Dimeracris Niu & Zheng, 1993
 Phaeocatantops Dirsh, 1953
 Stenocrobylus Gerstaecker, 1869
 Trichocatantops Uvarov, 1953
 Xenocatantops Dirsh, 1953
 Tribe Diexiini Mistshenko, 1945
 Bufonacridella Adelung, 1910
 Diexis Zubovski, 1899
 Tribe Gereniini Brunner von Wattenwyl, 1893
 Anacranae Miller, 1934
 Anasedulia Dawwrueng, Storozhenko & Asanok, 2015
 Bibractella Storozhenko, 2002
 Gerenia Stål, 1878
 Leosedulia Storozhenko, 2009
 Tribe Histrioacridini Key, 1993
 Subtribe Histrioacridina Key, 1993
 Histrioacrida Sjöstedt, 1930
 Subtribe Scurrina Key, 1993
 Scurra Key, 1992
 Tribe Kakaduacridini Key, 1993
 Kakaduacris Key, 1992
 Tribe Merehanini Baccetti, 1984
 Merehana Kevan, 1957
 Tribe Mesambriini Brunner von Wattenwyl, 1893
 Celebesia Bolívar, 1917
 Mesambria Stål, 1878
 Pseudotraulia Laosinchai & Jago, 1980
 Pyrgophistes Key, 1992
 Ranacris You & Lin, 1983
 Traulia Stål, 1873
 Tribe Oxyrrhepini Tinkham, 1940
 Oxyrrhepes Stål, 1873
 Tribe Paraconophymatini Otte, 1995
 Paraconophyma Uvarov, 1921
 Tribe Tauchirini Tinkham, 1940
 Chapacris Tinkham, 1940
 Tauchira Stål, 1878
 Toacris Tinkham, 1940
 Tribe Urnisiellini Key, 1993
 Urnisiella Sjöstedt, 1930
 Tribe Uvaroviini Mistshenko, 1952
 Uvarovium Dirsh, 1927
 Tribe Wiltshirellini Shumakov, 1963
 Wiltshirella Popov, 1951
 Tribe Xenacanthippini Tinkham, 1940
 Xenacanthippus Miller, 1934
 Genus Group Serpusiae Johnston, 1956
 Aresceutica Karsch, 1896
 Auloserpusia Rehn, 1914
 Coenona Karsch, 1896
 Pteropera Karsch, 1891
 Segellia Karsch, 1891
 Serpusia Karsch, 1891
 Serpusilla Ramme, 1931
 Abisares Stål, 1878
 Allotriusia Karsch, 1896
 Alpinacris Bigelow, 1967
 Alulacris Zheng, 1981
 Alulacroides Zheng, Dong & Xu, 2010
 Ambrea Dirsh, 1962
 Amismizia Bolívar, 1914
 Anapropacris Uvarov, 1953
 Angolacris Dirsh, 1962
 Anischnansis Dirsh, 1959
 Anomalocatantops Jago, 1984
 Anthermus Stål, 1878
 Antita Bolívar, 1908
 Apalacris Walker, 1870
 Apalniacris Ingrisch, Willemse & Shishodia, 2004
 Arminda Krauss, 1892
 Assamacris Uvarov, 1942
 Bacuita Strand, 1932
 Bambusacris Henry, 1933
 Bannacris Zheng, 1980
 Barombia Karsch, 1891
 Beybienkoacris Storozhenko, 2005
 Bhutanacridella Willemse, 1962
 Bibracte Stål, 1878
 Binaluacris Willemse, 1932
 Brachaspis Hutton, 1898
 Brachycatantops Dirsh, 1953
 Brachyelytracris Baehr, 1992
 Brownacris Dirsh, 1958
 Bumacris Willemse, 1931
 Burmacris Uvarov, 1942
 Burttia Dirsh, 1951
 Calderonia Bolívar, 1908
 Callicatantops Uvarov, 1953
 Cardeniopsis Dirsh, 1955
 Cardenius Bolívar, 1911
 Carsula Stål, 1878
 Caryandoides Zheng & Xie, 2007
 Carydana Bolívar, 1918
 Cerechta Bolívar, 1922
 Choroedocus Bolívar, 1914
 Chromophialosphera Descamps & Donskoff, 1968
 Cingalia Ramme, 1941
 Circocephalus Willemse, 1928
 Coloracris Willemse, 1938
 Coniocara Henry, 1940
 Criotocatantops Jago, 1984
 Crobylostenus Ramme, 1929
 Cryptocatantops Jago, 1984
 Cylindracris Descamps & Wintrebert, 1967
 Deliacris Ramme, 1941
 Dendrocatantops Descamps & Wintrebert, 1966
 Descampsilla Wintrebert, 1972
 Digrammacris Jago, 1984
 Dioscoridus Popov, 1957
 Dirshilla Wintrebert, 1972
 Dubitacris Henry, 1937
 Duplessisia Dirsh, 1956
 Duviardia Donskoff, 1985
 Eliya Uvarov, 1927
 Enoplotettix Bolívar, 1913
 Epacrocatantops Jago, 1984
 Eritrichius Bolívar, 1898
 Eubocoana Sjöstedt, 1931
 Eupreponotus Uvarov, 1921
 Eupropacris Walker, 1870
 Exopropacris Dirsh, 1951
 Fer Bolívar, 1918
 Frontifissia Key, 1937
 Gemeneta Karsch, 1892
 Genimenoides Henry, 1934
 Gerunda Bolívar, 1918
 Guineacris Ramme, 1941
 Hadrolecocatantops Jago, 1984
 Harantacris Wintrebert, 1972
 Harpezocatantops Jago, 1984
 Hebridea Willemse, 1926
 Heinrichius Ramme, 1941
 Ikonnikovia Bey-Bienko, 1935
 Indomesambria Ingrisch, 2006
 Ischnansis Karsch, 1896
 Ixalidium Gerstaecker, 1869
 Javanacris Willemse, 1955
 Kinangopa Uvarov, 1938
 Kwidschwia Rehn, 1914
 Lefroya Kirby, 1914
 Longchuanacris Zheng & Fu, 1989
 Maculacris Willemse, 1932
 Madimbania Dirsh, 1953
 Maga Bolívar, 1918
 Magaella Willemse, 1974
 Malua Ramme, 1941
 Mananara Dirsh, 1962
 Mayottea Rehn, 1959
 Mazaea Stål, 1876
 Melicodes Uvarov, 1923
 Melinocatantops Jago, 1984
 Meltripata Bolívar, 1923
 Micronacris Willemse, 1957
 Milleriana Willemse, 1957
 Moessonia Willemse, 1922
 Molucola Bolívar, 1915
 Mopla Henry, 1940
 Naraikadua Henry, 1940
 Nathanacris Willemse & Ingrisch, 2004
 Navasia Kirby, 1914
 Noliba Bolívar, 1922
 Oenocatantops Dirsh, 1953
 Opharicus Uvarov, 1940
 Orthocephalum Willemse, 1921
 Oshwea Ramme, 1929
 Oxycardenius Uvarov, 1953
 Oxycatantops Dirsh, 1953
 Pachycatantops Dirsh, 1953
 Pagdenia Miller, 1934
 Palniacris Henry, 1940
 Paprides Hutton, 1898
 Paracardenius Bolívar, 1912
 Paracaryanda Willemse, 1955
 Parahysiella Wintrebert, 1972
 Paramesambria Willemse, 1957
 Paraperineta Descamps & Wintrebert, 1967
 Parapropacris Ramme, 1929
 Paraserpusilla Dirsh, 1962
 Parastenocrobylus Willemse, 1921
 Paratoacris Li & Jin, 1984
 Paraxenotettix Dirsh, 1961
 Pareuthymia Willemse, 1930
 Peitharchicus Brunner von Wattenwyl, 1898
 Pelecinotus Bolívar, 1902
 Perakia Ramme, 1929
 Perineta Dirsh, 1962
 Pezocatantops Dirsh, 1953
 Platycatantops Baccetti, 1985
 Platycercacris Zheng & Shi, 2001
 Pododula Karsch, 1896
 Pseudofinotina Dirsh, 1962
 Pseudogerunda Bey-Bienko, 1935
 Pseudohysiella Dirsh, 1962
 Pteroperina Ramme, 1929
 Pyramisternum Huang, 1983
 Racilia Stål, 1878
 Racilidea Bolívar, 1918
 Rugulacris Zheng & Wei, 2007
 Salinacris Willemse, 1957
 Sedulia Stål, 1878
 Serpusiacris Descamps & Wintrebert, 1967
 Serpusiformia Dirsh, 1966
 Seyrigacris Bolívar, 1932
 Shennongipodisma Zhong & Zheng, 2004
 Siamacris Willemse, 1955
 Siebersia Willemse, 1933
 Sinopodismoides Gong, Zheng & Lian, 1995
 Sphaerocranae Willemse, 1972
 Staurocleis Uvarov, 1923
 Striatosedulia Ingrisch, 1989
 Strombocardeniopsis Jago, 1984
 Sygrus Bolívar, 1889
 Tangana Ramme, 1929
 Tarbaleus Brunner von Wattenwyl, 1898
 Tauchiridea Bolívar, 1918
 Thymiacris Willemse, 1937
 Tinnevellia Henry, 1940
 Tonkinacrisoides Zheng & Wei, 2007
 Traulacris Willemse, 1933
 Triodicolacris Baehr, 1992
 Tuberofera Willemse, 1930
 Tunstallops Jago, 1984
 Utanacris Miller, 1934
 Uvarovacris Rehn, 1944
 Veseyacris Dirsh, 1959
 Visayia Rehn, 1944
 Vitticatantops Sjöstedt, 1931
 Vohemara Dirsh, 1966
 Xenotettix Uvarov, 1925
 Zeylanacris Rehn, 1944
 Subfamily Copiocerinae Brunner von Wattenwyl, 1893
 Tribe Aleuasini Brunner von Wattenwyl, 1893
 Aleuas Stål, 1878
 Zygoclistron Rehn, 1905
 Tribe Clematodini Rehn & Eades, 1961
 Apoxitettix Descamps, 1984
 Bucephalacris Giglio-Tos, 1894
 Clematodes Scudder, 1900
 Dellia Stål, 1878
 Tribe Copiocerini Brunner von Wattenwyl, 1893
 Genus Group Hippacrae Rehn & Rehn, 1944
 Cyphacris Gerstaecker, 1889
 Hippacris Scudder, 1875
 Adimantus Stål, 1878
 Antiphon Stål, 1878
 Caenacris Amédégnato & Descamps, 1979
 Chlorohippus Bruner, 1911
 Contacris Amédégnato & Descamps, 1979
 Copiocera Burmeister, 1838
 Copiocerina Descamps, 1978
 Copiotettix Descamps, 1984
 Episcopotettix Rehn, 1903
 Eumecacris Descamps & Amédégnato, 1972
 Monachidium Serville, 1831
 Oncolopha Stål, 1873
 Opshomala Serville, 1831
 Sinop Descamps, 1984
 Subfamily Coptacrinae Brunner von Wattenwyl, 1893
 Bocagella Bolívar, 1889
 Coptacra Stål, 1873
 Coptacrella Bolívar, 1902
 Coptacridia Ramme, 1941
 Cyphocerastis Karsch, 1891
 Ecphanthacris Tinkham, 1940
 Ecphymacris Bi, 1984
 Epistaurus Bolívar, 1889
 Eucoptacra Bolívar, 1902
 Eustaurus Mahmood & Yousuf, 2000
 Exochoderes Bolívar, 1882
 Hintzia Ramme, 1929
 Pamphagella Bruner, 1910
 Paracoptacra Karsch, 1896
 Parepistaurus Karsch, 1896
 Physocrobylus Dirsh, 1951
 Pirithoicus Uvarov, 1940
 Poecilocerastis Ramme, 1929
 Rhopaloceracris Tinkham, 1940
 Ruwenzoracris Rehn, 1914
 Subfamily Cyrtacanthacridinae Kirby, 1910
 Tribe Cyrtacanthacridini Kirby, 1910
 Anacridium Uvarov, 1923
 Chondracris Uvarov, 1923
 Cyrtacanthacris Walker, 1870
 Nomadacris Uvarov, 1923
 Orthacanthacris Karsch, 1896
 Patanga Uvarov, 1923
 Rhadinacris Uvarov, 1923
 Schistocerca Stål, 1873
 Valanga Uvarov, 1923
 Willemsea Uvarov, 1923
 †Proschistocerca Zeuner, 1937
 Acanthacris Uvarov, 1923
 Acridoderes Bolívar, 1889
 Adramita Uvarov, 1936
 Armatacris Yin, 1979
 Austracris Uvarov, 1923
 Bryophyma Uvarov, 1923
 Caledonula Uvarov, 1939
 Callichloracris Ramme, 1931
 Congoa Bolívar, 1911
 Cristacridium Willemse, 1932
 Finotina Uvarov, 1923
 Gowdeya Uvarov, 1923
 Halmenus Scudder, 1893
 Kinkalidia Sjöstedt, 1931
 Kraussaria Uvarov, 1923
 Mabacris Donskoff, 1986
 Nichelius Bolívar, 1888
 Ootua Uvarov, 1927
 Ordinacris Dirsh, 1966
 Ornithacris Uvarov, 1924
 Pachyacris Uvarov, 1923
 Pachynotacris Uvarov, 1923
 Parakinkalidia Donskoff, 1986
 Parapachyacris Yin & Yin, 2008
 Rhytidacris Uvarov, 1923
 Ritchiella Mungai, 1992
 Taiacris Donskoff, 1986
 Subfamily Egnatiinae Bey-Bienko & Mistshenko, 1951
 Tribe Egnatiini Bey-Bienko & Mistshenko, 1951
 Bienkonia Dirsh, 1970
 Charora Saussure, 1888
 Egnatiella Bolívar, 1914
 Egnatioides Vosseler, 1902
 Egnatius Stål, 1876
 Ferganacris Sergeev & Bugrov, 1988
 Paracharora Fishelson, 1993
 Paregnatius Uvarov, 1933
 Leptoscirtus Saussure, 1888
 Subfamily Eremogryllinae Dirsh, 1956
 Eremogryllus Krauss, 1902
 Notopleura Krauss, 1902
 Subfamily Euryphyminae Dirsh, 1956
 Acoryphella Giglio-Tos, 1907
 Acrophymus Uvarov, 1922
 Amblyphymus Uvarov, 1922
 Anabibia Dirsh, 1956
 Aneuryphymus Uvarov, 1922
 Brachyphymus Uvarov, 1922
 Calliptamicus Uvarov, 1922
 Calliptamuloides Dirsh, 1956
 Calliptamulus Uvarov, 1922
 Catantopoides Johnsen, 1990
 Euryphymus Stål, 1873
 Kevanacris Dirsh, 1961
 Pachyphymus Uvarov, 1922
 Phymeurus Giglio-Tos, 1907
 Platacanthoides Kirby, 1910
 Plegmapteroides Dirsh, 1959
 Plegmapteropsis Dirsh, 1956
 Plegmapterus Martínez y Fernández-Castillo, 1898
 Rhachitopis Uvarov, 1922
 Rhachitopoides Naskrecki, 1995
 Rhodesiana Dirsh, 1959
 Somaliacris Dirsh, 1959
 Surudia Uvarov, 1930
 Subfamily Eyprepocnemidinae Brunner von Wattenwyl, 1893
 Tribe Eyprepocnemidini Brunner von Wattenwyl, 1893
 Euprepocnemides Bolívar, 1914
 Eyprepocnemis Fieber, 1853
 Eyprepocprifas Donskoff, 1982
 Heteracris Walker, 1870
 Shirakiacris Dirsh, 1958
 Amphiprosopia Uvarov, 1921
 Belonocnemis Bolívar, 1914
 Cataloipus Bolívar, 1890
 Clomacris Popov, 1981
 Cyathosternum Bolívar, 1882
 Jagoa Popov, 1980
 Jucundacris Uvarov, 1921
 Malagacetrus Dirsh, 1962
 Malonjeacris Grunshaw, 1995
 Metaxymecus Karsch, 1893
 Neritius Bolívar, 1914
 Ogasawaracris Ito, 2003
 Oxyaeida Bolívar, 1914
 Paraneritius Jago, 1994
 Paraprocticus Grunshaw, 1995
 Phyllocercus Uvarov, 1941
 Squaroplatacris Liang & Zheng, 1987
 Taramassus Giglio-Tos, 1907
 Tenebracris Dirsh, 1962
 Tropidiopsis Bolívar, 1911
 Tylotropidius Stål, 1873
 Subfamily Gomphocerinae Fieber, 1853
 Tribe Acrolophitini Scudder, 1901
 Acrolophitus Thomas, 1871
 Bootettix Bruner, 1889
 Tribe Amblytropidiini Brunner von Wattenwyl, 1893
 Genus Group Peruviae Cadena-Castañeda & Cardona, 2015
 Apolobamba Bruner, 1913
 Peruvia Scudder, 1890
 Amblytropidia Stål, 1873
 Boopedon Thomas, 1870
 Caribacris Rehn & Hebard, 1938
 Fenestra Brunner von Wattenwyl, 1895
 Pseudoutanacris Jago, 1971
 Sinipta Stål, 1861
 Syrbula Stål, 1873
 Tribe Arcypterini Bolívar, 1914
 Adolfius Harz, 1988
 Amplicubitoacris Zheng, 2010
 Arcyptera Serville, 1838
 Asulconotoides Liu, 1984
 Asulconotus Ying, 1974
 Aulacobothrus Bolívar, 1902
 Berengueria Bolívar, 1909
 Brachypteracris Cao & Zheng, 1996
 Crucinotacris Jago, 1996
 Kangacris Yin, 1983
 Kangacrisoides Wang, Zheng & Niu, 2006
 Leionotacris Jago, 1996
 Leuconemacris Zheng, 1988
 Ningxiacris Zheng & He, 1997
 Pseudoarcyptera Bolívar, 1909
 Ptygonotus Tarbinsky, 1927
 Rhaphotittha Karsch, 1896
 Suacris Yin, Zhang & Li, 2002
 Transtympanacris Lian & Zheng, 1985
 Xinjiangacris Zheng, 1993
 Tribe Aulocarini Contreras & Chapco, 2006
 Ageneotettix McNeill, 1897
 Aulocara Scudder, 1876
 Eupnigodes McNeill, 1897
 Horesidotes Scudder, 1899
 Psoloessa Scudder, 1875
 Tribe Chrysochraontini Brunner von Wattenwyl, 1893
 Barracris Gurney, Strohecker & Helfer, 1964
 Chloealtis Harris, 1841
 Chrysochraon Fischer, 1853
 Confusacris Yin & Li, 1987
 Euchorthippus Tarbinsky, 1926
 Euthystira Fieber, 1852
 Euthystiroides Zhang, Zheng & Ren, 1995
 Mongolotettix Rehn, 1928
 Podismomorpha Lian & Zheng, 1984
 Podismopsis Zubovski, 1900
 Pseudoasonus Yin, 1982
 Tribe Cibolacrini Otte, 1981
 Cibolacris Hebard, 1937
 Heliaula Caudell, 1916
 Ligurotettix McNeill, 1897
 Xeracris Caudell, 1916
 Tribe Compsacrini Carbonell, 1995
 Chiapacris Otte, 1979
 Compsacris Bolívar, 1890
 Notopomala Jago, 1971
 Phaneroturis Bruner, 1904
 Silvitettix Bruner, 1904
 Staurorhectus Giglio-Tos, 1897
 Tribe Dociostaurini Mistshenko, 1974
 Albistriacris Zheng & Lu, 2002
 Dociostaurus Fieber, 1853
 Eremippus Uvarov, 1926
 Eremitusacris Liu, 1981
 Leva Bolívar, 1909
 Mizonocara Uvarov, 1912
 Notostaurus Bey-Bienko, 1933
 Xerohippus Uvarov, 1942
 Tribe Eritettigini Otte, 1981
 Amphitornus McNeill, 1897
 Compsacrella Rehn & Hebard, 1938
 Eritettix Bruner, 1889
 Opeia McNeill, 1897
 Tribe Gomphocerini Fieber, 1853
 Aeropedellus Hebard, 1935
 Bruneria McNeill, 1897
 Chorthippus Fieber, 1852
 Dasyhippus Uvarov, 1930
 Gomphoceridius Bolívar, 1914
 Gomphocerippus Roberts, 1941
 Gomphoceroides Zheng, Xi & Lian, 1992
 Gomphocerus Thunberg, 1815
 Mesasippus Tarbinsky, 1931
 Myrmeleotettix Bolívar, 1914
 Pezohippus Bey-Bienko, 1948
 Phlibostroma Scudder, 1875
 Pseudochorthippus Defaut, 2012
 Schmidtiacris Storozhenko, 2002
 Stauroderus Bolívar, 1897
 Stenobothroides Xu & Zheng, 1996
 Tribe Hypernephiini Mistshenko, 1973
 Anaptygus Mistshenko, 1951
 Asonus Yin, 1982
 Caucasippus Uvarov, 1927
 Dysanema Uvarov, 1925
 Eclipophleps Tarbinsky, 1927
 Grigorija Mistshenko, 1976
 Hebetacris Liu, 1981
 Hypernephia Uvarov, 1922
 Oknosacris Liu, 1981
 Oreoptygonotus Tarbinsky, 1927
 Ptygippus Mistshenko, 1951
 Saxetophilus Umnov, 1930
 Stristernum Liu, 1981
 Tribe Melanotettigini Otte, 1981
 Melanotettix Bruner, 1904
 Tribe Mermiriini Brunner von Wattenwyl, 1893
 Achurum Saussure, 1861
 Mermiria Stål, 1873
 Pseudopomala Morse, 1896
 Tribe Ochrilidiini Brunner von Wattenwyl, 1893
 Gonista Bolívar, 1898
 Kirmania Uvarov, 1933
 Ochrilidia Stål, 1873
 Oxypterna Ramme, 1952
 Tribe Orinhippini Yin, Xia et al., 2003
 Orinhippus Uvarov, 1921
 Tribe Orphulellini Otte, 1979
 Dichromorpha Morse, 1896
 Laplatacris Rehn, 1939
 Orphulella Giglio-Tos, 1894
 Orphulina Giglio-Tos, 1894
 Tribe Ramburiellini Defaut, 2012
 Ramburiella Bolívar, 1906
 Tribe Scyllinini Brunner von Wattenwyl, 1893
 Alota Bruner, 1913
 Borellia Rehn, 1906
 Carrascotettix Carbonell, 1995
 Cauratettix Roberts, 1937
 Euplectrotettix Bruner, 1900
 Jagomphocerus Carbonell, 1995
 Meloscirtus Bruner, 1906
 Parapellopedon Jago, 1971
 Pellopedon Bruner, 1911
 Rhammatocerus Saussure, 1861
 Scyllinula Carbonell, 1995
 Stereotettix Rehn, 1906
 Tribe Stenobothrini Harz, 1975
 Megaulacobothrus Caudell, 1921
 Omocestus Bolívar, 1878
 Stenobothrus Fischer, 1853
 Genus Group Paropomala
 Cordillacris Rehn, 1901
 Paropomala Scudder, 1899
 Prorocorypha Rehn, 1911
 Acantherus Scudder & Cockerell, 1902
 Acocksacris Dirsh, 1958
 Amesotropis Karsch, 1893
 Anablepia Uvarov, 1938
 Azarea Uvarov, 1926
 Baidoceracris Chopard, 1947
 Brachycrotaphus Krauss, 1877
 Brainia Uvarov, 1922
 Carinulaenotus Yin, 1982
 Catabothrus Uvarov, 1962
 Chrysacris Zheng, 1983
 Chrysochraoides Ren et al., 1993
 Cophohippus Uvarov, 1953
 Dhimbama Henry, 1940
 Diablepia Kirby, 1902
 Dianacris Yin, 1983
 Dnopherula Karsch, 1896
 Eleutherotheca Karny, 1907
 Ermia Popov, 1957
 Esselenia Hebard, 1920
 Faureia Uvarov, 1921
 Gelastorhinus Brunner von Wattenwyl, 1893
 Inyangana Naskrecki, 1992
 Italohippus Fontana & La Greca, 1999
 Karruhippus Brown, 1989
 Komandia Uvarov, 1953
 Kraussella Bolívar, 1909
 Leurohippus Uvarov, 1940
 Lounsburyna Uvarov, 1922
 Macrokangacris Yin, 1983
 Madurea Bolívar, 1902
 Malagasippus Descamps & Wintrebert, 1966
 Megafrohippus Jago, 1996
 Melinohippus Jago, 1996
 Mesopsis Bolívar, 1906
 Minihippus Jago, 1996
 Neoleva Jago, 1996
 Ovambohippus Brown, 1972
 Pacris Zhang, Zhang & Yin, 2012
 Paragonista Willemse, 1932
 Paragymnobothrus Karny, 1910
 Pegasidion Saussure, 1861
 Phonogaster Henry, 1940
 Platypternodes Bolívar, 1908
 Pnorisa Stål, 1861
 Primnia Stål, 1873
 Pseudegnatius Dirsh, 1956
 Pseudoberengueria Jago, 1996
 Pseudogmothela Karny, 1910
 Pseudoleva Jago, 1996
 Pusillarolium Zheng, 1999
 Quangula Uvarov, 1953
 Rammeihippus Woznessenskij, 1996
 Salariacris Descamps & Wintrebert, 1966
 Sporobolius Uvarov, 1941
 Squamopenna Lian & Zheng, 1984
 Stenohippus Uvarov, 1926
 Tanalanacris Descamps & Wintrebert, 1966
 Thyridota Uvarov, 1925
 Tinaria Stål, 1861
 Unalia Koçak & Kemal, 2008
 Xenocheila Uvarov, 1933
 Subfamily Habrocneminae Yin, 1982
 Habrocnemis Uvarov, 1930
 Longzhouacris You & Bi, 1983
 Menglacris Jiang & Zheng, 1994
 Subfamily Hemiacridinae Dirsh, 1956
 Tribe Cranaeini Brunner von Wattenwyl, 1893
 Cranae Stål, 1878
 Cranaella Ramme, 1941
 Craneopsis Willemse, 1933
 Opiptacris Walker, 1870
 Paracranae Willemse, 1931
 Phalaca Bolívar, 1906
 Philicranae Willemse, 1955
 Tribe Dirshacrini Spearman, 2013
 Dirshacris Brown, 1959
 Euloryma Spearman, 2013
 Hemiloryma Brown, 1973
 Labidioloryma Grunshaw, 1986
 Tribe Gergisini Dirsh, 1962
 Gergis Stål, 1875
 Malagasacris Rehn, 1944
 Morondavia Dirsh, 1962
 Pachyceracris Dirsh, 1962
 Tribe Hemiacridini Dirsh, 1956
 Hemiacris Walker, 1870
 Hemipristocorypha Dirsh, 1952
 Pristocorypha Karsch, 1896
 Tribe Hieroglyphini Bolívar, 1912
 Hieroglyphodes Uvarov, 1922
 Hieroglyphus Krauss, 1877
 Parahieroglyphus Carl, 1916
 Tribe Leptacrini Johnston, 1956
 Acanthoxia Bolívar, 1906
 Leptacris Walker, 1870
 Meruana Sjöstedt, 1910
 Sudanacris Uvarov, 1944
 Tribe Mesopserini Otte, 1995
 Mesopsera Bolívar, 1908
 Xenippa Stål, 1878
 Xenippacris Descamps & Wintrebert, 1966
 Calamippa Henry, 1940
 Clonacris Uvarov, 1943
 Euthymia Stål, 1875
 Galideus Finot, 1908
 Glauningia Ramme, 1929
 Hysiella Bolívar, 1906
 Kassongia Bolívar, 1908
 Lopheuthymia Uvarov, 1943
 Onetes Rehn, 1944
 Oraistes Karsch, 1896
 Paulianiobia Dirsh & Descamps, 1968
 Proeuthymia Rehn, 1944
 Pseudoserpusia Dirsh, 1962
 Siruvania Henry, 1940
 Willemsella Miller, 1934
 Xenippella Kevan, 1966
 Xenippoides Chopard, 1952
 Subfamily Incolacridinae Tinkham, 1940
 Asymmetritania Storozhenko, 2021
 Bettotania Willemse, 1933
 Incolacris Willemse, 1932
 Stolzia Willemse, 1930
 Subfamily Leptysminae Brunner von Wattenwyl, 1893
 Tribe Chloropseustini Amédégnato, 1974
 Chloropseustes Rehn, 1918
 Tribe Leptysmini Brunner von Wattenwyl, 1893
 Belosacris Rehn & Eades, 1961
 Carbonellacris Roberts, 1977
 Columbacris Bruner, 1911
 Cylindrotettix Bruner, 1906
 Leptysma Stål, 1873
 Leptysmina Giglio-Tos, 1894
 Seabratettix Roberts, 1980
 Stenacris Walker, 1870
 Tucayaca Bruner, 1920
 Tribe Tetrataeniini Brunner von Wattenwyl, 1893
 Genus Group Oxybleptae Amédégnato, 1977
 Guetaresia Rehn, 1929
 Haroldgrantia Carbonell, Ronderos & Mesa, 1967
 Stenopola Stål, 1873
 Xenismacris Descamps & Amédégnato, 1972
 Genus Group Tetrataeniae Brunner von Wattenwyl, 1893
 Cornops Scudder, 1875
 Eumastusia Bruner, 1911
 Mastusia Stål, 1878
 Nadiacris Descamps & Amédégnato, 1972
 Oxybleptella Giglio-Tos, 1894
 Tetrataenia Stål, 1873
 Oxyphyma Saussure, 1861
 Subfamily Marelliinae Eades, 2000
 Marellia Uvarov, 1929
 Subfamily Melanoplinae Scudder, 1897
 Tribe Conalcaeini Cohn & Cantrall, 1974
 Barytettix Scudder, 1897
 Conalcaea Scudder, 1897
 Huastecacris Fontana & Buzzetti, 2007
 Oedomerus Bruner, 1907
 Tribe Dactylotini Scudder, 1897
 Aztecacris Roberts, 1947
 Campylacantha Scudder, 1897
 Dactylotum Charpentier, 1845
 Dasyscirtus Bruner, 1908
 Gymnoscirtetes Scudder, 1897
 Liladownsia Fontana, Mariño-Pérez, Woller & Song, 2014
 Paraidemona Brunner von Wattenwyl, 1893
 Paratylotropidia Brunner von Wattenwyl, 1893
 Perixerus Gerstaecker, 1873
 Poecilotettix Scudder, 1897
 Tribe Dichroplini Rehn & Randell, 1963
 Genus Group Scotussae Dinghi, Confalonieri & Cigliano, 2009
 Atrachelacris Giglio-Tos, 1894
 Chlorus Giglio-Tos, 1898
 Dichromatos Cigliano, 2007
 Eurotettix Bruner, 1906
 Leiotettix Bruner, 1906
 Ronderosia Cigliano, 1997
 Scotussa Giglio-Tos, 1894
 Apacris Hebard, 1931
 Baeacris Rowell & Carbonell, 1977
 Bogotacris Ronderos, 1979
 Boliviacris Ronderos & Cigliano, 1990
 Chibchacris Hebard, 1923
 Ciglianacris Cadena-Castañeda & Cardona, 2017
 Coyacris Ronderos, 1991
 Dichroplus Stål, 1873
 Digamacris Carbonell, 1989
 Hazelacris Ronderos, 1981
 Huaylasacris Cigliano, Pocco & Lange, 2011
 Keyopsis Ronderos & Cigliano, 1993
 Mariacris Ronderos & Turk, 1989
 Meridacris Roberts, 1937
 Neopedies Hebard, 1931
 Orotettix Ronderos & Carbonell, 1994
 Pediella Roberts, 1937
 Ponderacris Ronderos & Cigliano, 1991
 Pseudoscopas Hebard, 1931
 Timotes Roberts, 1937
 Yungasus Mayer, 2006
 Tribe Jivarini Hebard, 1924
 Argemiacris Ronderos, 1978
 Comansacris Ronderos & Cigliano, 1989
 Hydnosternacris Amédégnato & Descamps, 1978
 Intiacris Ronderos & Cigliano, 1989
 Jivarus Giglio-Tos, 1898
 Maeacris Ronderos, 1983
 Maylasacris Cigliano & Amédégnato, 2010
 Nahuelia Liebermann, 1942
 Oreophilacris Roberts, 1937
 Urubamba Bruner, 1913
 Tribe Melanoplini Scudder, 1897
 Aeoloplides Caudell, 1916
 Agroecotettix Bruner, 1908
 Aptenopedes Scudder, 1878
 Cephalotettix Scudder, 1897
 Chloroplus Hebard, 1918
 Eotettix Scudder, 1897
 Floridacris Otte, 2014
 Floritettix Otte, 2014
 Hesperotettix Scudder, 1876
 Hypochlora Brunner von Wattenwyl, 1893
 Melanoplus Stål, 1873
 Necaxacris Roberts, 1939
 Netrosoma Scudder, 1897
 Oedaleonotus Scudder, 1897
 Paroxya Scudder, 1877
 Phaedrotettix Scudder, 1897
 Philocleon Scudder, 1897
 Phoetaliotes Scudder, 1897
 Sinaloa Scudder, 1897
 Tribe Podismini Jacobson, 1905
 Subtribe Miramellina Rehn & Randell, 1963
 Anapodisma Dovnar-Zapolskij, 1932
 Capraiuscola Galvagni, 1986
 Chortopodisma Ramme, 1951
 Cophopodisma Dovnar-Zapolskij, 1932
 Curvipennis Huang, 1984
 Epipodisma Ramme, 1951
 Indopodisma Dovnar-Zapolskij, 1932
 Italopodisma Harz, 1973
 Miramella Dovnar-Zapolskij, 1932
 Nadigella Galvagni, 1986
 Oropodisma Uvarov, 1942
 Pseudoprumna Dovnar-Zapolskij, 1932
 Rammepodisma Weidner, 1969
 Zubovskya Dovnar-Zapolskij, 1932
 Subtribe Podismina Jacobson, 1905
 Appalachia Rehn & Rehn, 1936
 Booneacris Rehn & Randell, 1962
 Dendrotettix Packard, 1890
 Micropodisma Dovnar-Zapolskij, 1932
 Niitakacris Tinkham, 1936
 Odontopodisma Dovnar-Zapolskij, 1932
 Ognevia Ikonnikov, 1911
 Podisma Berthold, 1827
 Pseudopodisma Mistshenko, 1947
 Yunnanacris Chang, 1940
 Subtribe Tonkinacridina Ito, 2015
 Fruhstorferiola Willemse, 1922
 Parapodisma Mistshenko, 1947
 Pedopodisma Zheng, 1980
 Sinopodisma Chang, 1940
 Tonkinacris Carl, 1916
 Genus Group Bradynotae Rehn & Randell, 1963
 Argiacris Hebard, 1918
 Asemoplus Scudder, 1897
 Bradynotes Scudder, 1880
 Buckellacris Rehn & Rehn, 1945
 Hebardacris Rehn, 1952
 Hypsalonia Gurney & Eades, 1961
 Kingdonella Uvarov, 1933
 Anepipodisma Huang, 1984
 Bohemanella Ramme, 1951
 Cophoprumna Dovnar-Zapolskij, 1932
 Dicranophyma Uvarov, 1921
 Eokingdonella Yin, 1984
 Genimen Bolívar, 1917
 Gibbitergum Zheng & Shi, 1998
 Guizhouacris Yin & Li, 2006
 Liaopodisma Zheng, 1990
 Pachypodisma Dovnar-Zapolskij, 1932
 Paratonkinacris You & Li, 1983
 Peripodisma Willemse, 1972
 Phaulotettix Scudder, 1897
 Podismodes Ramme, 1939
 Prumna Motschulsky, 1859
 Prumnacris Rehn & Rehn, 1944
 Pseudozubovskia Zheng, Lin, Zhang & Zeng, 2014
 Qinlingacris Yin & Chou, 1979
 Rectimargipodisma Zheng, Li & Wang, 2004
 Rhinopodisma Mistshenko, 1954
 Taipodisma Yin, Zheng & Yin, 2014
 Xiangelilacris Zheng, Huang & Zhou, 2008
 Agnostokasia Gurney & Rentz, 1964
 Aidemona Brunner von Wattenwyl, 1893
 Akamasacris Cigliano & Otte, 2003
 Duartettix Perez-Gelabert & Otte, 2000
 Karokia Rehn, 1964
 Longgenacris You & Li, 1983
 Mexacris Otte, 2007
 Mexitettix Otte, 2007
 Nisquallia Rehn, 1952
 Oaxaca Fontana, Buzzetti & Mariño-Pérez, 2011
 Parascopas Bruner, 1906
 Pedies Saussure, 1861
 Propedies Hebard, 1931
 Psilotettix Bruner, 1908
 Radacris Ronderos & Sánchez, 1983
 Tijucella Amédégnato & Descamps, 1979
 Tiyantiyana Cigliano, Pocco & Lange, 2011
 Subfamily Oedipodinae Walker, 1871
 Tribe Acrotylini Johnston, 1956
 Acrotylus Fieber, 1853
 Pusana Uvarov, 1940
 Tribe Anconiini Hebard, 1937
 Anconia Scudder, 1876
 Tribe Arphiini Otte, 1995
 Arphia Stål, 1873
 Lactista Saussure, 1884
 Leuronotina Hebard, 1932
 Tomonotus Saussure, 1861
 Tribe Bryodemini Bey-Bienko, 1930
 Andrea Mistshenko, 1989
 Angaracris Bey-Bienko, 1930
 Bryodema Fieber, 1853
 Bryodemacris Benediktov, 1998
 Bryodemella Yin, 1982
 Compsorhipis Saussure, 1889
 Uvaroviola Bey-Bienko, 1930
 Tribe Chortophagini Otte, 1995
 Chimarocephala Scudder, 1875
 Chortophaga Saussure, 1884
 Encoptolophus Scudder, 1875
 Nebulatettix Gómez, Lightfoot & Miller, 2012
 Shotwellia Gurney, 1940
 Tribe Epacromiini Brunner von Wattenwyl, 1893
 Aiolopus Fieber, 1853
 Demirsoyus Sirin & Çiplak, 2004
 Epacromius Uvarov, 1942
 Heteropternis Stål, 1873
 Hilethera Uvarov, 1923
 Jasomenia Bolívar, 1914
 Paracinema Fischer, 1853
 Parahilethera Zheng & Ren, 2007
 Platypygius Uvarov, 1942
 Tribe Hippiscini Blatchley, 1920
 Agymnastus Scudder, 1897
 Camnula Stål, 1873
 Cratypedes Scudder, 1876
 Hadrotettix Scudder, 1876
 Heliastus Saussure, 1884
 Hippiscus Saussure, 1861
 Leprus Saussure, 1861
 Pardalophora Saussure, 1884
 Sticthippus Scudder, 1892
 Xanthippus Saussure, 1884
 Tribe Locustini Kirby, 1825
 Subtribe Locustina Kirby, 1825
 Locusta Linnaeus, 1758
 Oedaleus Fieber, 1853
 Psophus Fieber, 1853
 Brunnerella Saussure, 1888
 Chifanicus Benediktov, 2001
 Gastrimargus Saussure, 1884
 Grammoscapha Uvarov, 1942
 Locustana Uvarov, 1921
 Pternoscirta Saussure, 1884
 Ptetica Saussure, 1884
 Pycnodictya Stål, 1873
 Pyrgodera Fischer von Waldheim, 1846
 Scintharista Saussure, 1884
 Tribe Machaerocerini Otte, 1995
 Machaerocera Saussure, 1859
 Tribe Oedipodini Walker, 1871
 Celes Saussure, 1884
 Mioscirtus Saussure, 1888
 Ochyracris Zheng, 1991
 Oedipoda Latreille, 1829
 Oedipodacris Willemse, 1932
 Tribe Parapleurini Brunner von Wattenwyl, 1893
 Ceracris Walker, 1870
 Ceracrisoides Liu, 1985
 Formosacris Willemse, 1951
 Mecostethus Fieber, 1852
 Parapleurodes Ramme, 1941
 Stethophyma Fischer, 1853
 Yiacris Zheng & Chen, 1993
 Tribe Psinidiini Otte, 1970
 Derotmema Scudder, 1876
 Hippopedon Saussure, 1861
 Mestobregma Scudder, 1876
 Metator McNeill, 1901
 Psinidia Stål, 1873
 Trachyrhachys Scudder, 1876
 Trepidulus McNeill, 1901
 Tribe Sphingonotini Johnston, 1956
 Conipoda Saussure, 1884
 Cophotylus Krauss, 1902
 Eusphingoderus Bey-Bienko, 1950
 Eusphingonotus Bey-Bienko, 1950
 Heliopteryx Uvarov, 1914
 Helioscirtus Saussure, 1884
 Hyalorrhipis Saussure, 1884
 Microtes Scudder, 1900
 Phaeonotus Popov, 1951
 Pseudoceles Bolívar, 1899
 Quadriverticis Zheng, 1999
 Sphingoderus Bey-Bienko, 1950
 Sphingonotus Fieber, 1852
 Tetramerotropis Saussure, 1888
 Thalpomena Saussure, 1884
 Vosseleriana Uvarov, 1924
 Tribe Trilophidiini Shumakov, 1963
 Trilophidia Stål, 1873
 Tribe Trimerotropini Blatchley, 1920
 Circotettix Scudder, 1876
 Conozoa Saussure, 1884
 Dissosteira Scudder, 1876
 Spharagemon Scudder, 1875
 Trimerotropis Stål, 1873
 Tribe Tropidolophini Otte, 1995
 Tropidolophus Thomas, 1873
 Angaracrisoides Gong & Zheng, 2003
 Asphingoderus Bey-Bienko, 1950
 Atympanum Yin, 1982
 Aulocaroides Werner, 1913
 Aurilobulus Yin, 1979
 Austroicetes Uvarov, 1925
 Brancsikellus Berg, 1899
 Chinabacris Kumar & Usmani, 2016
 Chloebora Saussure, 1884
 Chondronotulus Uvarov, 1956
 Chortoicetes Brunner von Wattenwyl, 1893
 Crinita Dirsh, 1949
 Cyanicaudata Yin, 1979
 Diraneura Scudder, 1897
 Dittopternis Saussure, 1884
 Elmisia Dirsh, 1949
 Eremoscopus Bey-Bienko, 1951
 Eurysternacris Chopard, 1947
 Fitzgeraldia Uvarov, 1952
 Homoeopternis Uvarov, 1953
 Humbe Bolívar, 1882
 Jinabia Uvarov, 1952
 Kinshaties Zheng, 1977
 Leptopternis Saussure, 1884
 Melaniacris Zheng, Zhao & Dong, 2011
 Meristopteryx Saussure, 1888
 Morphacris Walker, 1870
 Nepalacris Balderson & Yin, 1987
 Oreacris Bolívar, 1911
 Promesosternus Yin, 1982
 Pseudaiolopus Hollis, 1967
 Pycnocrania Uvarov, 1941
 Pycnodella Descamps, 1965
 Pycnostictus Saussure, 1884
 Qualetta Sjöstedt, 1921
 Rashidia Uvarov, 1933
 Tibetacris Chen, 1964
 Tmetonota Saussure, 1884
 Uganda Bolívar, 1909
 Zimbabwea Miller, 1949
 † Aestilocusta Zhang, 1989
 † Mioedipoda Stidham & Stidham, 2000
 † Nymphacrida Zhang, Sun & Zhang, 1994
 † Oedemastopoda Zhang, Sun & Zhang, 1994
 Subfamily Ommatolampidinae Brunner von Wattenwyl, 1893
 Tribe Abracrini Amédégnato, 1974
 Abracris Walker, 1870
 Agesander Stål, 1878
 Arimacris Matiotti da Costa & Silva Carvalho, 2006
 Caruaruacris Matiotti da Costa & Silva Carvalho, 2006
 Eujivarus Bruner, 1911
 Eusitalces Bruner, 1911
 Ixalotettix Amédégnato & Descamps, 1979
 Jodacris Giglio-Tos, 1897
 Liebermannacris Matiotti da Costa & Silva Carvalho, 2006
 Monneacris Amédégnato & Descamps, 1979
 Omalotettix Bruner, 1906
 Orthoscapheus Bruner, 1906
 Parasitalces Bruner, 1911
 Psiloscirtus Bruner, 1911
 Rhachicreagra Rehn, 1905
 Robustusacris Matiotti da Costa & Silva Carvalho, 2006
 Roppacris Amédégnato & Descamps, 1979
 Salvadoracris Matiotti da Costa & Silva Carvalho, 2006
 Sitalces Stål, 1878
 Teinophaus Bruner, 1908
 Xiphiola Bolívar, 1896
 Tribe Aspidophymini Bolívar, 1884
 Aspidophyma Bolívar, 1884
 Loepacris Descamps & Amédégnato, 1973
 Malezacris Amédégnato & Poulain, 1998
 Thamnacris Descamps & Amédégnato, 1972
 Tribe Clematodinini Amédégnato, 1974
 Clematodina Günther, 1940
 Rehnuciera Carbonell, 1969
 Tribe Ommatolampidini Brunner von Wattenwyl, 1893
 Subtribe Ommatolampina Brunner von Wattenwyl, 1893
 Dicaearchus Stål, 1878
 Episomacris Carbonell & Descamps, 1978
 Eucosmetacris Carbonell & Descamps, 1978
 Eulampiacris Carbonell & Descamps, 1978
 Hippariacris Carbonell & Descamps, 1978
 Kyphiacris Carbonell & Descamps, 1978
 Lamiacris Carbonell & Descamps, 1978
 Leptopteracris Carbonell & Descamps, 1978
 Muriciacris Matiotti da Costa, 2014
 Nepiopteracris Carbonell & Descamps, 1978
 Ommatolampis Burmeister, 1838
 Peruana Koçak & Kemal, 2008
 Ronderosacris Carbonell & Descamps, 1978
 Stenelutracris Carbonell & Descamps, 1978
 Tingomariacris Carbonell & Descamps, 1978
 Subtribe Oulenotacrina Amédégnato, 1977
 Agrotacris Descamps, 1979
 Anablysis Gerstaecker, 1889
 Ananotacris Descamps, 1978
 Antiphanes Stål, 1878
 Barypygiacris Descamps, 1979
 Demochares Bolívar, 1906
 Eurybiacris Descamps, 1979
 Hysterotettix Descamps, 1979
 Odontonotacris Descamps, 1978
 Pseudhypsipages Descamps, 1977
 Subtribe Vilernina Brunner von Wattenwyl, 1893
 Genus Group Nicarchae Brunner von Wattenwyl, 1893
 Acridocryptus Descamps, 1976
 Aptoceras Bruner, 1908
 Bryophilacris Descamps, 1976
 Cryptacris Descamps & Rowell, 1984
 Hypsipages Gerstaecker, 1889
 Nicarchus Stål, 1878
 Rhabdophilacris Descamps, 1976
 Sciaphilacris Descamps, 1976
 Sclerophilacris Descamps, 1976
 Agenacris Amédégnato & Descamps, 1979
 Caletes Redtenbacher, 1892
 Carbonelliella Cadena-Castañeda & Cardona, 2015
 Leptomerinthoprora Rehn, 1905
 Leticiacris Amédégnato & Descamps, 1978
 Locheuma Scudder, 1897
 Lysacris Descamps & Amédégnato, 1972
 Machaeropoles Rehn, 1909
 Pseudovilerna Descamps & Amédégnato, 1989
 Reyesacris Fontana, Buzzetti & Mariño-Pérez, 2011
 Sciponacris Descamps, 1978
 Vilerna Stål, 1873
 Tribe Pauracrini Amédégnato, 1974
 Christenacris Descamps & Rowell, 1984
 Pauracris Descamps & Amédégnato, 1972
 Tribe Pycnosarcini Liebermann, 1951
 Apoxycephalacris Amédégnato & Descamps, 1978
 Pycnosarcus Bolívar, 1906
 Tribe Syntomacrini Amédégnato, 1974
 Subtribe Caloscirtina Descamps, 1977
 Adelacris Descamps & Amédégnato, 1972
 Anoptotettix Amédégnato & Descamps, 1979
 Ateliacris Descamps & Rowell, 1978
 Beoscirtacris Descamps, 1977
 Calohippus Descamps, 1978
 Caloscirtus Bruner, 1911
 Eugenacris Descamps & Amédégnato, 1972
 Hylescirtacris Descamps, 1978
 Machigengacris Descamps, 1977
 Miacris Descamps, 1981
 Microtylopteryx Rehn, 1905
 Ociotettix Amédégnato & Descamps, 1979
 Ortalacris Descamps & Amédégnato, 1972
 Oteroa Amédégnato & Descamps, 1979
 Oyampiacris Descamps, 1977
 Pseudanniceris Descamps, 1977
 Stigacris Descamps, 1977
 Subtribe Syntomacrina Amédégnato, 1974
 Amblyxypha Uvarov, 1925
 Anniceris Stål, 1878
 Deinacris Amédégnato & Descamps, 1979
 Osmiliola Giglio-Tos, 1897
 Phaulacris Amédégnato & Descamps, 1979
 Pollostacris Amédégnato & Descamps, 1979
 Pseudococama Descamps & Amédégnato, 1971
 Rhabdoscirtus Bruner, 1911
 Rhopsotettix Amédégnato & Descamps, 1979
 Rhyphoscirtus Amédégnato & Descamps, 1979
 Seabracris Amédégnato & Descamps, 1979
 Syntomacrella Descamps, 1978
 Syntomacris Walker, 1870
 Xiphidiopteron Bruner, 1910
 Acridurus Perez-Gelabert, Dominici, Hierro & Otte, 1995
 Beckeracris Amédégnato & Descamps, 1979
 Guajirus Perez-Gelabert, 2020
 Hispanacris Perez-Gelabert, Dominici, Hierro & Otte, 1995
 Hispanotettix Perez-Gelabert, Dominici, Hierro & Otte, 1995
 Lagidacris Amédégnato & Descamps, 1979
 Tergoceracris Perez-Gelabert & Otte, 2003
 Subfamily Oxyinae Brunner von Wattenwyl, 1893
 Tribe Oxyini Brunner von Wattenwyl, 1893
 Bermiella Bolívar, 1912
 Bermiodes Bolívar, 1912
 Bermius Stål, 1878
 Daperria Sjöstedt, 1921
 Emeiacris Zheng, 1981
 Gesonula Uvarov, 1940
 Lucretilis Stål, 1878
 Nepalocaryanda Ingrisch, 1990
 Oxya Serville, 1831
 Oxyina Hollis, 1975
 Pseudocaryanda Willemse, 1939
 Pseudocranae Bolívar, 1898
 Pseudoxya Yin & Liu, 1987
 Quilta Stål, 1861
 Thanmoia Ramme, 1941
 Tolgadia Sjöstedt, 1920
 Tribe Praxibulini Rehn, 1957
 Kosciuscola Sjöstedt, 1934
 Methiola Sjöstedt, 1920
 Methiolopsis Rehn, 1957
 Praxibulus Bolívar, 1906
 Badistica Karsch, 1891
 Boninoxya Ishikawa, 2011
 Chitaura Bolívar, 1918
 Cylindrotiltus Ramme, 1929
 Digentia Stål, 1878
 Dirshia Brown, 1962
 Gerista Bolívar, 1905
 Hilloxya Kumar & Chandra, 2019
 Hygracris Uvarov, 1921
 Ochlandriphaga Henry, 1933
 Oxycrobylus Ingrisch, 1989
 Oxytauchira Ramme, 1941
 Pterotiltus Karsch, 1893
 Subfamily Pauliniinae Hebard, 1923
 Paulinia Blanchard, 1843
 Subfamily Pezotettiginae Brunner von Wattenwyl, 1893
 Pezotettix Burmeister, 1840
 Sphenophyma Uvarov, 1934
 Subfamily Proctolabinae Amédégnato, 1974
 Tribe Coscineutini Brunner von Wattenwyl, 1893
 Coscineuta Stål, 1873
 Tribe Proctolabini Amédégnato, 1974
 Subtribe Eucephalacrina Amédégnato & Poulain, 1987
 Eucephalacris Descamps, 1976
 Pareucephalacris Descamps, 1976
 Subtribe Lithoscirtina Amédégnato & Poulain, 1987
 Ampelophilus Hebard, 1924
 Drymacris Descamps & Rowell, 1978
 Drymophilacris Descamps, 1976
 Leioscapheus Bruner, 1907
 Lithoscirtus Bruner, 1908
 Paratela Descamps & Rowell, 1978
 Tela Hebard, 1932
 Subtribe Proctolabina Amédégnato, 1974
 Adelotettix Bruner, 1910
 Azotocerus Descamps, 1976
 Balachowskyacris Descamps & Amédégnato, 1972
 Cercoceracris Descamps, 1976
 Cryptocloeus Descamps, 1976
 Dendrophilacris Descamps, 1976
 Dorstacris Descamps, 1978
 Halticacris Descamps, 1976
 Kritacris Descamps, 1976
 Poecilocloeus Bruner, 1910
 Proctolabus Saussure, 1859
 Witotacris Descamps, 1976
 Zodiacris Descamps, 1980
 Zosperamerus Bruner, 1908
 Subtribe Saltonacrina Amédégnato & Descamps, 1980
 Eucerotettix Descamps, 1980
 Harpotettix Descamps, 1981
 Loretacris Amédégnato & Poulain, 1987
 Saltonacris Descamps, 1976
 Ypsophilacris Descamps, 1980
 Subfamily Rhytidochrotinae Brunner von Wattenwyl, 1893
 Brakeracris Rowell, 1995
 Chiriquacris Rowell & Bentos-Pereira, 2005
 Driphilacris Descamps & Amédégnato, 1972
 Exerythracris Rowell, 1995
 Galidacris Descamps & Amédégnato, 1972
 Hylopedetes Rehn, 1929
 Lathacris Descamps & Amédégnato, 1972
 Liparacris Descamps & Amédégnato, 1972
 Micropaon Descamps & Rowell, 1984
 Muyscacris Hebard, 1923
 Oedalacris Descamps & Amédégnato, 1972
 Opaon Kirby, 1902
 Opaonella Hebard, 1923
 Parapiezops Hebard, 1923
 Paropaon Hebard, 1923
 Piezops Hebard, 1923
 Rhytidochrota Stål, 1873
 Scirtopaon Descamps & Rowell, 1984
 Talamancacris Rowell, 1995
 Trichopaon Descamps & Amédégnato, 1972
 Subfamily Spathosterninae Rehn, 1957
 Tribe Spathosternini Rehn, 1957
 Laxabilla Sjöstedt, 1934
 Paraspathosternum Ramme, 1929
 Spathosternum Krauss, 1877
 Subfamily Teratodinae Brunner von Wattenwyl, 1893
 Acrostegastes Karsch, 1896
 Esfandiaria Popov, 1951
 Eurynotacris Ramme, 1931
 Kabulia Ramme, 1928
 Lyrotyloides Bey-Bienko, 1956
 Lyrotylus Uvarov, 1924
 Robecchia Schulthess, 1898
 Teratodes Brullé, 1835
 Subfamily Tropidopolinae Jacobson, 1905
 Tribe Tristriini Mistshenko, 1945
 Tristria Stål, 1873
 Tristriella Descamps & Wintrebert, 1967
 Tribe Tropidopolini Jacobson, 1905
 Tropidopola Stål, 1873
 Afroxyrrhepes Uvarov, 1943
 Chloroxyrrhepes Uvarov, 1943
 Dabba Uvarov, 1933
 Homoxyrrhepes Uvarov, 1926
 Limnippa Uvarov, 1941
 Mesopsilla Ramme, 1929
 Musimoja Uvarov, 1953
 Neooxyrrhepes Khan & Usmani, 2019
 Petamella Giglio-Tos, 1907
 Pseudotristria Dirsh, 1961
 Tribe Eucopiocerini Descamps, 1975
 Chapulacris Descamps, 1975
 Eucopiocera Bruner, 1908
 Halffterina Descamps, 1975
 Leptalacris Descamps & Rowell, 1978
 Atopacris Amédégnato & Poulain, 1998
 Castetsia Bolívar, 1902
 Jumandiacris Amédégnato & Poulain, 1998
 Melliacris Ramme, 1941
 Palandella Amédégnato & Poulain, 1998
 Pileolum Bolívar, 1917
 Tylotropidiopsis Storozhenko, 1992
 †Heeracris Zeuner, 1937
 †Menatacridium Piton, 1936
 †Taeniopodites Cockerell, 1909
 †Tyrbula Scudder, 1885

References